is a Japanese electronics and aircraft manufacturer that was founded in 1973 and is headquartered in Tokyo.  As an electronics manufacturer the company specializes in karaoke equipment.

History
Between about 1992 and 2003 the company branched into the design and manufacture of paramotor harnesses, canopies and engines. The company produced several designs of aircraft engines, including the DK 472. The company's foray into aircraft production did not result in the projected market size and the company exited the field in about 2003.

In 2001, Daiichi Kosho entered into the Japanese music industry through acquiring Japanese record labels Nippon Crown and Tokuma Japan Communications (former subsidiary of Tokuma Shoten). On April 1, 2010, Nippon Crown and Tokuma Japan Communications formed the music distribution company Crown Tokuma.

Aircraft

References

External links

1973 establishments in Japan
Aircraft manufacturers of Japan
Manufacturing companies based in Tokyo
Mass media companies based in Tokyo
Manufacturing companies established in 1973
Japanese brands
Karaoke
Music companies of Japan
Paramotors